The characters BYM
can mean
Baltimore Yearly Meeting
Britain Yearly Meeting,
both organizational structures of the Religious Society of Friends (Quakers)
Bais Yaakov Machon, a High School for Jewish girls in Queens, New York City.
 BYM is the international code for Bayamo (Cuba) Civil Airport.
Backyard Monsters
 BYM stands for Bright Yellow Mini as in a Liquid Yellow 2002-2006 Mini Cooper S automobile.